Corral is a 1954 National Film Board of Canada (NFB) short film documentary about the life of a cowboy, directed by Colin Low and produced by Tom Daly. It featured cinematography by Wolf Koenig and a musical score by Eldon Rathburn, and was produced as part of the NFB's postwar Canada Carries On series.

Synopsis 
With the aid of a trained dog, a cowboy (Wallace Jensen) in southwestern Alberta, has located and rounded up a large herd of wild horses. Driving the mustangs into a corral at the Cochrane Ranch, he begins the process of "breaking" each horse. The process is a familiar one for cowboys that requires years of experience and a knowledge of handling horses.

Selecting one wild horse that is marked with a white streak on its face, the cowboy lassoes the horse and cinches the rope to a large stump, gradually pulling the animal closer to him. Once the wild horse gets used to his hands near the head, ears and neck, the cowboy ties a rope halter on its head. The next step is to introduce a loose halter, fitted without a bridle and bit and finally, a blanket and saddle on the half-broken steed.

The cowboy mounts the rearing, high-spirited mustang, and driving through the open corral, rides rapidly at break-neck speed across the Alberta Rocky Mountain Foothills, until his mount is finally able to get used to his rider. The cowboy reins in the charging steed, slowing the gait to a trot, finally heading back to the ranch.

Production
Filmmaker Colin Low got the idea for the film after attending a cattle auction in 1952 with his father, who had worked as a foreman at the Cochrane Ranch, in what is now Cochrane, Alberta. The following summer, Low asked NFB colleague Wolf Koenig, an ex-farm boy, if he would like to come to Alberta to make a film about a cowboy. Koenig was in the NFB Animation Department, with film becoming his first live-action production using a new Arriflex cinema camera fitted with a gyro stabilizer.

Corral  has no narration,  although Low had been initially worried that he would need extensive narration to explain the process of horse breaking. The film represents a break in tradition for the NFB, which had until that time, relied heavily on narration in its documentaries. Low had left the narration for colleague Stanley Jackson to write over the weekend. When Low and producer Daly arrived on Monday to see the finished film Jackson had said, "it's done." However, when they gathered around the moviola to watch the film, the visual were accompanied only by Rathburn's musical score. "Where's the commentary?" someone reportedly asked. Jackson replied, "What would a commentary do for that?"

The gentle guitar score and use of handheld camera also breaks with Hollywood's traditionally epic portal of the cowboy.

Corral was shot in 1953 at the Cochrane Ranch. Low's father provided the horses and his top hand, "Wally" Jensen. Low had written a script but Jensen re-wrote it as they filmed. Film producer Tom Daly edited the film with Eldon Rathburn writing the score for two jazz guitarists, based on well-known cowboy songs.

Reception
In April 1954, Corral would play theatrically across Canada and in some American cities, including Washington, D.C. Individual films in the Canada Carries On series were further distributed worldwide by the NFB and were also made available to film libraries operated by university and provincial authorities. A total of 199 films in the Canada Carries On series were produced before the series was canceled in 1959.

Awards
 Venice Film Festival, Venice, Italy: First Prize, Documentary Films, 1954
 Durban International Film Festival, Durban, South Africa: Second Prize/Bronze Medal, Documentary 1954
 Edinburgh International Film Festival, Edinburgh, Scotland: Diploma of Merit, Arts, 1954
 Golden Reel International Film Festival, Film Council of America, New York: Recognition of Merit, 1955
 7th Canadian Film Awards, Toronto: Special Mention, Non-Theatrical Short 1955

References

Notes

Citations

Bibliography

 Evans, Gary. In the National Interest: A Chronicle of the National Film Board of Canada from 1949 to 1989. Toronto: University of Toronto Press, 2001. . 
 Rist, Peter Harry. Guide to the Cinema(s) of Canada. Westport, Connecticut: Greenwood Publishing Group, 2001. .

External links 
 
 

Films directed by Colin Low (filmmaker)
1954 short films
National Film Board of Canada documentaries
Films set in Alberta
Canadian short documentary films
Cowboy culture
Black-and-white documentary films
Films shot in Alberta
1954 documentary films
Films scored by Eldon Rathburn
Films produced by Tom Daly
Films about horses
Canada Carries On
Films about animals
1950s short documentary films
1950s English-language films
Canadian black-and-white films
1950s Canadian films